Armageddon: 2089 is a role-playing game published by Mongoose Publishing in 2003.

Description
Armageddon: 2089 is a d20 System game set in a future world with giant mechs.

Publication history
Armageddon: 2089 was published by Mongoose Publishing in 2003.

References
 

British role-playing games
Mecha role-playing games
Mongoose Publishing games
Role-playing games introduced in 2003